The 1929–30 Kansas Jayhawks men's basketball team represented the University of Kansas during the 1929–30 college men's basketball season.

Roster
Frank Bausch
Jim Bausch
Tom Bishop
Forrest Cox
Theodore O'Leary
Leland Page
Floyd Ramsey
Russell Thomson
Bruce Voran

Schedule

References

Kansas Jayhawks men's basketball seasons
Kansas
Kansas
Kansas